Cimber may refer to:

 Lucius Tillius Cimber (fl. 44 BC), ancient Roman governor, one of the assassins of Julius Caesar
 Cimber Sterling, Danish airline
 Cimber (airline), Danish airline, established in 2012
 Adam Cimber (born 1990), American professional baseball player
 Matt Cimber (born 1936), movie director